Class 1000 may refer to:

Class 1000 Shinkansen, a class of Japanese trains built in the 1960s
NS Class 1000, a class of Dutch electric locomotives built in the 1940s
Korail Class 1000, a class of South Korean trains built from 1974 to 1996
Midland Railway 1000 Class, a class of British steam locomotives first built in 1902
GWR 1000 Class, a British steam locomotive built in the 1940s
LRTA 1000 class, 1980s light rail vehicles operated by the Light Rail Manila Corporation
Class 1000 (standard), a cleanroom standard for air purity